Rajagopalan Radhakrishnan (commonly known as R. Radhakrishnan, born 1949) is Distinguished Professor of English and Comparative Literature at the University of California, Irvine. He is a postcolonial theorist and literary critic.

Radhakrishnan earned his PhD in 1983 from Binghamton University. He moved to UC Irvine from the University of Massachusetts Amherst in the 2004–2005 academic year.

Radhakrishnan is the 2020 winner of the Distinguished Achievement Award for Outstanding Scholarship of the South Asian Literary Association.

Selected works
A Tamil prose reader: selections from contemporary Tamil prose (compiled with R. E. Asher, 1971)
Diasporic Mediations: Between Home and Location (1996)
Theory in an Uneven World (2003)
Between Identity and Location: The Cultural Politics of Theory (2007)
Transnational South Asians: The Making of a Neo-diaspora (edited with Susan Koshy, 2008)
History, the Human, and the World Between (2008)
Theory after Derrida: Essays in Critical Praxis (edited with Kailash C. Baral, 2009; 2nd ed., 2018)
A Said Dictionary (2012)

References

American literary critics
American male writers of Indian descent
Tamil writers
Indian emigrants to the United States
University of California, Irvine faculty
University of Massachusetts Amherst faculty
Tamil poets
1949 births
Scholars of nationalism
Living people
American people of Indian Tamil descent
Binghamton University alumni
Binghamton University faculty
University of Madras alumni
Academic staff of the University of Madras
American male poets
University of Michigan fellows
American male non-fiction writers